The death of Chan Yin-lam occurred during the 2019 Hong Kong protests, and gave rise to speculations by protesters about its cause. Lam was a 15-year-old student who died on or shortly after 19 September 2019. Her naked corpse was found floating in the sea near Yau Tong, Hong Kong, on 22 September 2019. Following a preliminary autopsy, police asserted that no foul play was suspected and that Chan had killed herself, while there were allegations that she was murdered by Hong Kong authorities in connection with her participation in the 2019 Hong Kong protests. The coroner's inquest concluded with the jury unanimously returning an open verdict, after Magistrate Ko Wai-hung ruled out both homicide and suicide as possible causes due to insufficient evidence to support this.

Background 
Chan Yin-lam, also known as Christy Chan, was 15 years old. Her parents were separated. She had a "complicated" family background and a history of running away from home. Prior to her disappearance, she had been staying at a girls' home.

She attended the Pok Oi Hospital Tang Pui King Memorial College, Hong Kong, and had, just a few days prior to her disappearance, started a course at the Youth College attached to the Vocational Training Council (VTC). She also worked a part-time job in the restaurant trade. Media reports indicate that Chan had won awards in inter-school swimming competitions. Chan had received regular diving training and was once a member of the diving team. 

Chan's death took place in the backdrop of the 2019–2020 Hong Kong protests, and the increasing distrust of the government and hostility towards the police. According to her friends, while Chan had attended protests, police confirmed that she had not been arrested during the protests.

Disappearance and death 
On 19 September at 14:15, Chan left a group of friends at Mei Foo and sent a message to some friends stating she was going back home. It was her last message before her disappearance. Friends put out a missing person's brief after she failed to reappear; her family called the police on 21 September. According to surveillance footage from Youth College she attended, she left the campus barefoot and walked towards the waterfront near Tseung Kwan O on 19 September. She was reported missing two days later.

MTR confirmed that station cleaners had found a mobile phone and some stationery belonging to Chan on the ground near an exit of Tiu Keng Leng station, while the station staff contacted Chan's family members as confirmed by the call log of the mobile phone. Her family member picked up the lost property two days later.

At 11 am on 22 September, a man who was fishing saw a floating object with a human form 100m off the coast from Devil's Peak. Police boats were dispatched, and it was found to be the naked corpse of a human female. Police initially reported that the victim was a female suspected of being between 25 and 30 years of age, 1.5m in height, medium build, with long blond hair. On 9 October, responding to media inquiries, police confirmed that the naked corpse belonged to the 15-year-old Chan. 

The police originally requested a court warrant on 27 September on the grounds that the case was a murder, but changed the categorisation to "dead body found" (not suspicious) several days later. Her mother's later interview and the police's assertion that Chan had killed herself were met with some scepticism: there were doubts that Chan had killed herself by drowning because she was an award-winning swimmer. Furthermore, waning trust in the government and the police, and the change in designation led to rumours circulating on social media. The police and government officials were rumoured to have murdered her for participating in the 2019 Hong Kong protests and then covered-up her death. The Hong Kong police and government have denied these allegations. Pro-government posts, photos, memes and videos also propagated unsubstantiated claims that foreign forces were behind the demonstrations.

HKDI footage 
Students from the Hong Kong Design Institute where she was a student demanded the release of CCTV footage from 19 September as Chan was last seen on campus. On 15 October, after a sit-in, campus management acceded to the demands and released some partial footage, but disgruntled students demanded the integral unedited footage with a 30-minute deadline. When they failed to comply with the deadline, school premises were vandalised, surveillance cameras were damaged and a fire alarm was set off. The VTC later suspended all classes between 15 and 17 October. The VTC has since released additional CCTV clips after 200 students, amid class suspension, rallied inside the campus to support an online appeal for an indefinite class boycott.

After the Design Institute had disclosed surveillance videos and the girl's mother had appealed for an end to the speculation of Chan's death, students continued to demand the release of integral footage from surveillance cameras for 29 and 30 October. Masked protesters accused the school of downplaying the situation; they continued to damage facilities and equipment on campus for two days, with the police ended up having to be called.

It has been suggested that the girl in the footage was an imposter, and that an actress had appeared in some cover-up by authorities. For the coroner's inquest, Chan's family members, social workers, and friends all identified the girl on the footage as Chan. Ho Yun-loi, her grandfather, added that he saw Chan in the same clothing on the morning of 19 September. The Coroner's Court jury accepted in the verdict that the girl in the footage was Chan.

Cremation 
Chan's body was cremated on 10 October, the day after police had confirmed the corpse as Chan's. Suspicions were stirred at the apparently hasty cremation of Chan's body soon after the death, but the police countered that the coroner had authorised the process. Former forensic pathologist Philip Beh Swan-lip commented that the circumstances of the discovery and cremation of Chan's body were suspicious: discoveries of fully naked bodies in the sea are generally treated as suspect and would require thorough investigations.  Beh agreed that Chan's body had been hastily cremated, and urged police to release further information about the autopsy and for a coroner's inquest to be undertaken.

Interview and harassment of Chan's mother 
In an interview with TVB News on 17 October, Chan's mother, Ho Pui-yee, said that after looking at all the relevant CCTV footage, she believed that her daughter's death was a suicide. She said that although she was initially suspicious of the death, she said that her daughter was not emotionally stable, and may well have had psychosis as repeated auditory hallucinations had prevented her from sleeping. She said that her daughter once participated in distributing the leaflet of the protests in June, but had become disillusioned by July. She added that she had been doxxed since her daughter's death, resulting in her being harassed at work and telephoned at all hours. Ho pleaded to the general public to end the speculation and for her to be left alone.

Some disputed Ho's identity in the early days following Chan's death. She had long hair and wore a surgical mask in her TV interview, but some people online pointed to Facebook photos of Chan's mother with shorter hair in July 2019 to question the identity of Ho as Chan's mother. A DNA test conducted for the Coroner's Court inquest on 9 July 2020 verified Ho's identity as Chan's mother. On 24 August 2020, two people were arrested for public order offences after a crowd harassed Ho as she left the Coroner's Court hearing.

Coroner's Court inquest
A coroner's inquest took place in late August and early September 2020 to investigate the cause and circumstances of Chan Yin-lam's death.

Mental state
Social worker Wong Yin-lai stated that, in March 2019, Chan tried to suffocate herself with a plastic bag, for which she was sent to the Tuen Mun Hospital, but Wong viewed it as an attempt to escape from her girls' home. Doctor Lam Chi-pang of Tuen Mun Hospital said that Chan had self-harm intentions and was diagnosed with acute stress disorder and defiant disorder. Psychiatrist Yeung Yu-hang of Castle Peak Hospital, who visited Chan in the Tuen Mun Hospital after she damaged facilities in the girls' home on 19 August 2019, said that Chan revealed to him that she was hearing two voices in her head that were blaming her and thus started harming herself, but that she did not want to kill herself. Lam Chi-pang and psychiatrist Sarah Theresa Chung also repeated the same observation that Chan did not want to kill herself. Wong recalled that, after Chan's discharge from the hospital on 22 August, Chan told her that she heard voices inside her head when she did not sleep well. Wong also said that Chan appeared normal after taking sedatives prescribed by the hospital, but that she was unsure if Chan had stopped taking them before her death.

As expert witness, the forensic psychiatrist Robyn Ho (Ho Mei-yee) said that Chan appeared to show symptoms of multiple mental illnesses and that her symptoms (such as her confused state of mind, capricious behaviour, and complaints about hearing non-existent voices) suggested that she suffered from an early stage of psychosis, a condition that brings a higher risk of suicide and may result in difficulty with body coordination during an episode. She also pointed to Chan's increased risk for mental illness due to her family history as her father had been hospitalised several times for several months at a time due to his psychosis. According to Ho, Chan's behaviour demonstrated signs of a potential psychotic break in the period leading to the death.

In the verdict, the jury said that they could not ascertain whether Chan exhibited psychotic symptoms on 19 September 2019. They noted the failure of the Hospital Authority to effectively follow up on cases of teenagers with mental health issues, especially after the inquest heard that Chan might have developed psychotic symptoms a month before her death.

Final hours 
Chiu Kwan-yi, a classmate of Chan, said that Chan showed odd behaviour on the final day before her disappearance. Chan had returned to school at 11 am and used a classmate's schoolbag as pillow to sleep on a classroom floor, but got up 10 minutes later after the teacher and other classmates repeatedly urged her, and explained her lateness to Chiu in a WhatsApp message that "It's so scary. I spent the whole night awake and packing stuff. Crazy." After her class ended at 1 pm, Chan was clearing her school locker for half an hour and said to Chiu that she would return to the Tseung Kwan O campus that night but did not give a reason for it. Then, Chan and Chiu together went to Tiu Keng Leng MTR station and took a train, but Chan refused to take a seat and sat on the floor instead. Chan did not change trains at Mei Foo station, as she usually would do with Chiu, and said that she would not return home that afternoon. In WhatsApp, Chan wrote that she went to Prince Edward station and arrived at a shopping centre in Tsim Sha Tsui. Chan's last message, sent at 5.18 pm, was a cryptic "That's very bad of you guys," but Chiu said that she did not understand what it meant. Ho Yun-loi, Chan's grandfather, said that Chan was packing her room overnight and complained about hearing voices that made it difficult for her to sleep.

The court heard that Chan, as seen in security footage, returned to Tiu Keng Leng MTR station at 5.40 pm and left some of her personal possessions including a mobile phone outside the station's exit A before she walked away. Chong Lam-kin, the station's control officer, said that he learned that Chan's mother was outside Hong Kong and did not know her daughter's whereabouts when he used the phone to call the mother one hour later.

The police showed a compilation of footage showing Chan, initially wearing shoes and later barefooted, walking throughout the Hong Kong Design Institute (HKDI) for 70 minutes from 5.50 to 7 pm when she left the premise without footwear towards a nearby housing estate. In the footage, Chan is seen leaving behind some of her belongings; the court heard that some were found on a bench in the podium floor of block B. Leung Po-yi, the HKDI administrative officer, said that Chan's belongings—including an identity card, a student ID, a mobile phone, and an Octopus card—were turned in later that night. The police said that the Octopus card belonged to another person who lost the card one year before Chan's death and did not know Chan. Lee said that Chan's shoes could not be found.

Chan Ka-chun, a HKDI graduate, stated that he saw Chan wandering around absent-mindedly without shoes at Tiu Keng Leng MTR station around 7.20 pm. Chow Tai-lai, a taxi driver, claimed that Chan got into his car and asked to be driven to a construction site next to LOHAS Park MTR station, a few hundred metres from a promenade, on that night. The jury could not verify the veracity of Chow's statement i n the absence of corroboration, and concluded that Chan last appeared inside Tiu Keng Leng MTR station after 7 pm on 19 September 2019.

Examination of the body
Lau Yin-kai, the man who discovered the body, said that he and his son went fishing on a boat at 10 am on 22 September 2019 near Devil's Peak, after which they saw the body floating in the water. Marine Police Superintendent Man Wai-cheung, who examined the body after it was airlifted to a marine police base in Sai Wan Ho on 22 September 2019, said that he did not find significant injuries on the body that could have caused death. Police Constable Chan Kwok-wing said that his superior, Man Wai-cheung, ruled the case as suspicious as the body was stark naked, but Man denied that he made such a classification as he could not give a preliminary finding on the circumstances of death due to the body's decomposed state and lack of apparent fatal injuries. When asked by the jury if Chan's clothes could have been washed away, Man answered that it was possible as summer clothes are lighter.

The forensic pathologists Lai Sai-chak and Garrick Li (Li Yuk-wah), who both performed the autopsy, stated that there was a distinct possibility that Chan had drowned, given the lack of apparent fatal injuries on the body and indications that the body was in the water for a substantial period, but concluded that the cause of death could not be confirmed due to the decomposition of the body. They determined that Chan died within 24 hours after her disappearance on 19 September 2019. They believed that the body was in the water for a substantial period, as there was widespread shedding and bleaching of the skin on the limbs. They also found that the body was relatively intact despite the decay, suggesting that Chan was not subjected to violence or sexual assault before her death. Li stated that there was no fatal injuries or self-defense injuries on the body, and that there was no drugs or poison in the body but that a blood test for alcohol could not be conducted due to the body's decay. Wai Wing-kong, a chemist, found no conclusive evidence that Chan was sexually assaulted, as there was no DNA from another person in the vagina or under the fingernails. Lee Wing-man, a laboratory technologist, said that she found no fabrics inside Chan's fingernails, which could have indicated a dispute prior to death, but noted that it also could have been washed away by the sea current if it was present. Hong Yau-hin, a forensic toxicologist, stated that he concluded that Chan had not taken any medicine or drugs in the days before her death.

As expert witness, medical professor and forensic pathologist Philip Beh (Beh Swan-lip) challenged the suggestion that Chan had drowned herself. Beh said that it was very unsettling that the body was stark naked when discovered in the water, since loose clothing could wash away but tight-fitting clothing such as underwear was unlikely to come off naturally. He agreed that it was difficult to determine the manner of death due to the body's decomposition, but pointed out that the volume of fluids found in Chan's lungs was much less and unusually uneven compared to typical cases of drowning. In response, Li said that he could not explain the findings, but could only guess that one side of the lungs bore more fluid due to faster decomposition at the other side. Beh also said that DNA evidence for sexual abuse could have been diluted in the water. He further criticised the pathologists' decision to not undertake a diatom test on the body, as diatoms of the nearby water would be found in the body to determine if a person had drowned.

The jury concluded that Chan died between the night of 19 September and the following day. They also concluded that she was found naked because she entered the water without clothes on rather than that strong waves had washed the clothes away. They recommended that the Department of Health should conduct a diatom test in cases where the cause of death could not be determined due to decomposition of a body.

Verdict
Magistrate Ko Wai-hung ruled out suicide and homicide as possible causes for Chan's death due to insufficient evidence to support this. He stated that there was no evidence that Chan had been assaulted, bore grudges or had disputed with anyone, was under the threat of personal injury, or was under the influence of medicine or drugs, as well as that intoxication by an unidentified drug had no basis in established facts. He further stated that the evidence was incompatible with suicide, citing the standard of proof beyond a reasonable doubt. The inquest resulted in an open verdict, as the jury was unable to determine the cause and circumstances of Chan's death. This verdict was made unanimously by the five-person jury.

After the inquest ruling, the Hong Kong Police Force said that it was prepared to take further action in the case and made a public appeal for those with knowledge of the case to come forward. Ko ordered the police to retain one of Chan's mobile phones, an iPhone, for a year and investigate further if new evidence was obtained from the device; the phone was found locked, so data could not be retrieved from it.

Cultural references 
In the self-penned Cantonese composition "Explicit Comment" (人話) released in late 2019, singer-songwriter Charmaine Fong made reference to the public's scepticism of the official narrative of Chan's death with the lyric "The truth has long since disappeared, write your ridiculous plots". In the associated music video, the last-known footage of Chan and of police press conferences are juxtaposed.

See also 
 Death of Chow Tsz-lok
 Death of Luo Changqing
 List of solved missing person cases
 List of unsolved deaths

References 

2010s missing person cases
2019–2020 Hong Kong protests
2019 in Hong Kong
Conspiracy theories in China
Chan, Yin-lam
Chan, Yin-lam
Chan, Yin-lam
Formerly missing people
Missing person cases in China
Chan, Yin-lam